Road 33 (Also known as Qafqaz (Caucuses) Highway) is a road in Ardabil Province connecting Ardabil to Germi and Bileh Savar, crossing into Republic of Azerbaijan.

References

External links 

 Iran road map on Young Journalists Club

Roads in Iran